Nephalioides nigriventris is a species of beetle in the family Cerambycidae. It was described by Bates in 1874.

References

Elaphidiini
Beetles described in 1874